Espen Schjerven (born 8 May 1983 in Norway) is a Norwegian retired footballer. Besides Norway, he has played in New Zealand.

Career

Schjerven started his career with Lyn Fotball.

After helping Lyn Fotball finish 3rd in 2002, Schjerven signed for Football Kingz in New Zealand. After that, he signed for Manglerud Star Toppfotball.

In 2006, he went to Poland for medical studies after playing in the Norwegian second and third divisions.

In 2008, at the age of 25, he started playing for the C team of Norwegian lower league side Korsvoll IL, scoring 3 goals on debut against IL Jardar's 2nd team. Despite receiving offers from teams in higher divisions, Schjerven stayed put with the Korsvoll IL C team due to the possibility of breaking goal records.

References

External links
 

Norwegian footballers
Living people
Association football midfielders
1983 births
Association football forwards
Lyn Fotball players
Football Kingz F.C. players